Gladys Cox Hansen (June 12, 1925 – March 5, 2017) was an American librarian, archivist and author. She was an expert on the history of San Francisco and the 1906 San Francisco earthquake.

Early life and education
Hansen was born in 1925 in Berkeley, California. She moved to San Francisco as a child, and lived there for the rest of her life. She graduated from Lowell High School and attended San Francisco State College (now San Francisco State University) briefly, but did not earn a degree.

Career
At age 17, Hansen began working part-time at the Presidio branch of the San Francisco Public Library. She then moved to the main branch, and by 1963 she was in charge of the California collection of the library. In 1972, she was named city archivist by Mayor Joseph Alioto.

In 1963, Hansen began to research the identities of those killed in 1906 earthquake. In 1989, Hansen co-authored the book Denial of Disaster, claiming that the number of casualties from the earthquake was dramatically and deliberately understated. The official death toll stated in 1907 was 478, but she estimated that over 3,000 were killed.

Hansen retired from the San Francisco Main Library in 1992, but continued her work on identifying earthquake victims.   In 2005, the San Francisco Board of Supervisors unanimously passed a resolution, co-authored by Hansen, that set aside the official 1907 death count.

In 1991, Hansen founded the Museum of the City of San Francisco. She also created a virtual museum website.

Aside from her library work, Hansen established San Francisco City Guides, a volunteer organization that gives walking tours of the city.

In 1997, Hansen received the Ron Ross Founder's Award from the San Francisco History Association.

Personal life
Hansen married William Hansen, who was an Air Corps pilot in World War II. They had a son, Richard.

Death
Hansen died of natural causes in San Francisco on March 5, 2017, at the age of 91.

Selected publications

References

1925 births
2017 deaths
1906 San Francisco earthquake
American archivists
American librarians
American women librarians
Female archivists
Writers from San Francisco
20th-century American women writers
20th-century American writers
21st-century American women writers
San Francisco State University alumni